The 2022–23 C.F. Monterrey season, commonly referred to as Monterrey, is the oldest active professional team from the northern part of Mexico. The team will participate in the Liga MX.

Players

Squad Information
Players and squad numbers last updated on 4 July 2022. Appearances include all competitions.Note: Flags indicate national team as has been defined under FIFA eligibility rules. Players may hold more than one non-FIFA nationality.

Transfers and loans

Pre-season and friendlies

Competitions

Overview

Liga MX

Torneo Apertura

League table

Results summary

Results round by round

Matches
The league fixtures were announced on 29 May 2022.

References

C.F. Monterrey seasons